This was the first edition of the tennis tournament.

Nadiia Kichenok and Raluca Olaru won the title, defeating Lyudmyla Kichenok and Makoto Ninomiya in the final, 7–6(8–6), 5–7, [10–8].

Seeds

Draw

Draw

References

External Links
Main Draw

Chicago Women's Open - Doubles